Holiday for Shoestrings is a 1946 Warner Bros. Merrie Melodies cartoon short directed by Friz Freleng. The short was released on February 23, 1946. The film is a spoof of the fairy tale "The Elves and the Shoemaker".

The plot concerns a pack of elves who help a shoemaker, Jake. The cartoon is set to a number of classical music pieces, some of which are used as running gags, especially from "The Nutcracker Suite". The title is a play on the David Rose number "Holiday for Strings". However, that tune is not played in the score.

The cartoon is done largely in pantomime, with the occasional (unintelligible) bickering of elves, many of which look like miniature versions of Elmer Fudd with elf-like ears (anticipating a similar role played by Elmer 10 years later).

Plot
Based on the classic Fairy Tale, the cartoon concerns a pack of Elmer Fudd-like elves who help a shoemaker, Jake, who has advertised for help.  The cartoon is done largely in pantomime with the gags timed to a number of classical music pieces, from such composers as Johann Strauss, Frederic Chopin, and Peter Ilyich Tchaikovsky, with the occasional (unintelligible) bickering of the elves.

The twist on the usual story is that the bedridden shoemaker, suddenly feeling much better upon seeing the elves working feverishly, tries to sneak out to play golf, possibly implying that the shoemaker was actually faking his illness the whole time to avoid from doing his job. The elves, realizing this, drag Jake back to bed, tie him down ala Gulliver's Travels, and are seen dragging the golf clubs out of the house for themselves to play a round with, at iris-out.

Notes
According to the 1999 Toonheads episode "Night Of 1000 Elves", the reason why the elves resemble Elmer Fudd is because director Friz Freleng apparently hated Elmer and therefore did such to make fun of the character.
At one scene one of the elves replace the shoe stickers from 4F to 1A. Those "4F" and "1A" were military terms used during World War II to describe the person's capability in the army, where "4F" means unfit for military service. However those references became dated during the cartoon's release, as at the time the cartoon was released in theaters, World War II had already ended.
Caricatures of Stan Laurel, Oliver Hardy, and Charlie Chaplin briefly appear in the short.

See also
 Looney Tunes and Merrie Melodies filmography (1940–1949)

References

External links
 Big Cartoon Database article at 
 Internet Movie Database article at 

Merrie Melodies short films
1946 animated films
1946 short films
1946 films
American Christmas films
Animated films without speech
Short films directed by Friz Freleng
1940s Warner Bros. animated short films
Films with screenplays by Michael Maltese
Films scored by Carl Stalling
Films about elves
Films based on fairy tales
Elmer Fudd films